The Cadillac Carnegie Public Library, now the Wexford County Historical Society Museum, was constructed as a Carnegie Library located at 127 Beech Street in Cadillac, Michigan.  It was designated a Michigan State Historic Site in 1980 and listed on the National Register of Historic Places in 2007.

History

In 1903, the Andrew Carnegie Foundation agreed to donate $15,000 toward the cost of a new library in Cadillac, subject to the community raising matching funds. The Cadillac Literary Society matched the funds, and in 1904 Scheurmann & Merriam Architects of Saginaw, Michigan were selected to design the building, and Freuchtel Construction Company was selected to be the building contractor.  The library was completed in 1906 at a cost of $30,000.  The building served as a public library until 1969.

After that time, it was used by the Cadillac Police Department until 1977, after which it was considered for demolition. The city accepted the Wexford County Historical Society's proposal to use the building as a museum, and it became the Wexford County Historical Society Museum.

Description
The Cadillac Public Library is a single story polygonal Classical Revival brick building sitting on a raised stone foundation.  It has a shallow-pitched hip roof with a low-pitched dome.  The entryway in through a simple door flanked by Ionic columns and surmounted with a semi-circular window.

References

External links
Wexford County Historical Society & Museum

Libraries on the National Register of Historic Places in Michigan
Neoclassical architecture in Michigan
Library buildings completed in 1906
Buildings and structures in Wexford County, Michigan
Michigan State Historic Sites
Museums in Wexford County, Michigan
Carnegie libraries in Michigan
National Register of Historic Places in Wexford County, Michigan
1906 establishments in Michigan